The Bishkek Protocol is a provisional ceasefire agreement, signed by the representatives of Armenia (Parliament Speaker Babken Ararktsian), the unrecognized Nagorno-Karabakh Republic (Parliament Speaker Karen Baburyan), Azerbaijan (First Deputy Parliament Speaker Afiyaddin Jalilov) and Russia's representative to the OSCE Minsk Group Vladimir Kazimirov on May 5, 1994 in Bishkek, the capital of Kyrgyzstan.

Background
Bishkek was proposed by Kyrgyz representative Medetkhan Sheremkulov who was head of negotiating group, and offered to proceed discussions in Bishkek, Kyrgyzstan after the first meeting between parliamentarians of Azerbaijan and Armenia on ceasing fire in Nagorno-Karabakh was held in Mariehamn. Talks between Azerbaijani and Armenian delegations continued for hours. A representative of Azerbaijan Afiyaddin Jalilov questioned the legitimacy of the participation of Armenians who lived in Karabakh, and required to include the name of Nizami Bakhmanov, a member of his delegation who was the mayor of Shusha in Nagorno-Karabakh in the protocol. The protocol and these points were a subject of discussions between President Heydar Aliyev and Kazimirov where it was agreed to include signature of Nizami Bakhmanov into the protocol. Vladimir Kazimirov stated the following in his memoirs: "Aliyev agreed. At the end of the page, two alterations were written in a legible handwriting in Russian. The name of N. Bakhmanov was written by hand but they could not find him in Baku for signature. On May 9, I took a copy of the text to Moscow with two alterations and the name of Bakhmanov but without his signature."

The protocol ended the First Nagorno-Karabakh War and froze the issue. The ceasefire was breached on a number of occasions, particularly during the 2008 clashes, 2016 clashes, and the 2020 Nagorno-Karabakh war.

References

External links 
Full text of the Bishkek Protocol
Official version in English
Text of all peace accords between Armenia and Azerbaijan

See also
Madrid Principles
Tehran Communiqué
Zheleznovodsk Communiqué

Ceasefires
First Nagorno-Karabakh War
History of Bishkek
Treaties of Armenia
Treaties of Azerbaijan
Treaties concluded in 1994
Treaties of Russia
Treaties of the Republic of Artsakh
May 1994 events in Asia